Wolverton Common is a hamlet in north Hampshire, England. Its nearest town is Tadley, which lies approximately 2.5 miles (4 km) east from the hamlet.

References

External links

Villages in Hampshire